Langenhorn may refer to:
Langenhorn, Hamburg, a quarter of Hamburg, Germany
Langenhorn (Nordfriesland), a municipality in Schleswig-Holstein, Germany